The New Synagogue is the synagogue of the Jewish community in Düsseldorf, Germany. The synagogue was built in the Golzheim district, far from the site of the former synagogue, which was located in the city center at Kasernenstraße. There the synagogue, built in 1905, was pillaged and burned by SA men during the Kristallnacht in 1938.

The synagogue is named after rabbi Leo Baeck, who served as a pulpit rabbi in Düsseldorf. It was inaugurated in September 1958. On 3 October 2000, the synagogue was firebombed. Since then, there is a constant police watch over the synagogue.

Arson attack

On October 2, 2000, two Arab immigrants committed an arson attack against the synagogue with three Molotov cocktails. Although the perpetrators remained unknown for over two months, most media suspected the attack was done by far-right antisemites. The following day, Paul Spiegel, leader of the Central Council of Jews in Germany, called for a clear sign of solidarity with the Jewish victims.

The perpetrators, a 20-year-old Palestinian, and a 19-year-old Moroccan, were identified and arrested on December 6, 2000. Both admitted they wanted to protest against the Israeli occupation policy through the attack.

See also
 History of the Jews in Germany

References

External links
 Official site 

Ashkenazi Jewish culture in Germany
Ashkenazi synagogues
Buildings and structures in Düsseldorf
Synagogues in North Rhine-Westphalia
Dusseldorf, New Synagogue
Orthodox synagogues in Germany